José Yordy Reyna Serna (born 17 September 1993) is a Peruvian professional footballer who plays as a striker for Russian club Torpedo Moscow.

Early life
Born in the city of Chiclayo, he moved to Lima at the age of 14. He gave such a good impression in his first try-out for Alianza Lima that he was given a place in the youth teams of the club. He continued to play well enough and this allowed him to rise through the ranks to the first team. His ability to create plays with short and long passes, score crucial goals and evade defenders with ease had earned him comparisons with his childhood idol Jefferson Farfán, a current Peruvian international and star with FC Schalke 04 in the German Bundesliga.

Club career

Alianza Lima 
In March 2011, he was promoted to the Alianza Lima first team after a great season in which he scored seven goals in the Torneo de Promoción y Reserva (the reserve league for first division teams) and the 2011 U-20 Copa Libertadores. Reyna finally made his league debut in the Peruvian First Division on 27 August 2011 in Round 20 at home against Inti Gas Deportes. He came on in the 90th minute for Paolo Hurtado to wrap up the 4–2 win in Matute. In his second match he was given more playing time as he came on in the 62nd minute for Joazhiño Arroe, but he could not help his side overturn the 2–0 defeat away to León de Huánuco. He only managed two league appearances in the 2011 season. In the 2012 season, he won a first team place after the departure of many players. He scored his first league goal against Sport Boys on 18 May 2012, in the 49th minute of play. He would go on to score five more times for his club side that season and for his efforts he won the award for Jugador Revelacion (Breakthrough Player) of the 2012 season.  In the 2013 season, Reyna scored six goals, including the game-winning goal against Universitario de Deportes in the Peruvian Clásico on 15 March.

Red Bull Salzburg
In the mid-2013 Reyna signed with the Austrian club Red Bull Salzburg for a rumoured transfer fee of 2 million euros. Reyna made his debut for Red Bull Salzburg in a friendly pre-season match where he had a spectacular performance and even scored the game winner. Since his debut he has been loaned to fellow Austrian clubs FC Liefering and SV Grödig.

In January 2015 he joined German club RB Leipzig on loan for the rest of the season.

Vancouver Whitecaps FC
In January 2017 Reyna joined the Canadian club Vancouver Whitecaps FC. He injured his foot during a preseason friendly and missed the first four months of the MLS season. He made his club debut on 1 July 2017, and scored his first goal, a game winner against New York City FC, a week later.

D.C. United
On 19 September 2020, Reyna was traded by the Whitecaps to D.C. United in exchange for $400,000 in 2021 General Allocation Money. He made his debut on 27 September 2020, playing 68 minutes in a 0–2 loss against the New England Revolution. Following the 2021 season, Reyna was released by D.C. United.

Charlotte FC
On 17 December 2021, Reyna signed as a free agent for Charlotte FC ahead of their inaugural MLS season in 2022. 

On 17 February 2023, Charlotte FC waived Reyna, as they exercised his contract buyout.

Torpedo Moscow
On 20 February 2023, Reyna signed a contract with Russian Premier League club Torpedo Moscow for six months, with an option to extend for an additional year.

International career

Peru under-20 team 

Reyna was a part of a 22-man roster for the Peru national under-20 football team that played in the 2013 South American Youth Championship held in Argentina. Playing in Group B, he scored against the Uruguay national under-20 football team in a 3–3 draw and against the Brazil national under-20 football team in a 2–0 win. After progressing from the group stage and into the hexagonal final stage, Reyna scored in a 1–3 loss against the Paraguay national under-20 football team and he scored twice against the Ecuador national under-20 football team in a 3–2 win. Unfortunately, Peru crashed out of the tournament with five points. However, Reyna earned 3rd place in the goal-scoring standings with five goals behind Nicolás Castillo and Nicolás López of Chile and Uruguay respectively.

Peru national football team 
On 22 March 2013, Reyna was selected for his first senior international game and played in a 1–0 WCQ victory against Chile in the Clásico del Pacífico rivalry after substituting Peru captain Claudio Pizarro in the 79th minute of the match. On 26 March 2013, just four days later, he started in the friendly against Trinidad and Tobago and scored his first international goal in the 41st minute after finishing a well played cross from Irven Ávila. On 1 June 2013, Reyna scored his second international goal in a 2–1 friendly win over Panama.

Career statistics

Club

International

Honors
 Austrian League:  2013–14, 2015–16
 Austrian Cup:  2013–14, 2015–16

Individual 
 Jugador Revelación (Breakthrough Player) of the 2012 Peruvian First Division

References

External links 
 
 
 Yordy Reyna at mlssoccer.com

1993 births
People from Chiclayo
Living people
Peruvian footballers
Peru under-20 international footballers
Peru international footballers
Association football forwards
Club Alianza Lima footballers
FC Red Bull Salzburg players
FC Liefering players
SV Grödig players
RB Leipzig players
Vancouver Whitecaps FC players
D.C. United players
Charlotte FC players
FC Torpedo Moscow players
Peruvian Primera División players
Austrian Football Bundesliga players
2. Liga (Austria) players
2. Bundesliga players
Major League Soccer players
Russian Premier League players
2015 Copa América players
Peruvian expatriate footballers
Expatriate footballers in Austria
Peruvian expatriate sportspeople in Austria
Expatriate footballers in Germany
Peruvian expatriate sportspeople in Germany
Expatriate soccer players in Canada
Peruvian expatriate sportspeople in Canada
Expatriate soccer players in the United States
Peruvian expatriate sportspeople in the United States
Expatriate footballers in Russia
Peruvian expatriate sportspeople in Russia